1958 in the Philippines details events of note that happened in the Philippines in the year 1958.

Incumbents

 President: Carlos P. Garcia (Nacionalista Party) 
 Vice President: Diosdado Macapagal (Liberal) 
 Chief Justice: Ricardo Paras 
 Congress: 4th (starting January 27)

Events

August
 August 28 – The Filipino first policy is promulgated.

Holidays

As per Act No. 2711 section 29, issued on March 10, 1917, any legal holiday of fixed date falls on Sunday, the next succeeding day shall be observed as legal holiday. Sundays are also considered legal religious holidays. Bonifacio Day was added through Philippine Legislature Act No. 2946. It was signed by then-Governor General Francis Burton Harrison in 1921. On October 28, 1931, the Act No. 3827 was approved declaring the last Sunday of August as National Heroes Day.

 January 1 – New Year's Day
 February 22 – Legal Holiday
 April 18 – Maundy Thursday
 April 19 – Good Friday
 May 1 – Labor Day
 July 4 – Philippine Republic Day
 August 13  – Legal Holiday
 August 31  – National Heroes Day
 November 28 – Thanksgiving Day
 November 30 – Bonifacio Day
 December 25 – Christmas Day
 December 30 – Rizal Day

Births
 January 10 – Pantaleon Alvarez, Speaker of the House of Representatives
 February 6 – Joel Banal, basketball player and coach
 February 24 – Milagrosa Tan, politician (d. 2019)
 March 3 – Neil Ocampo, anchorman (d. 2020)
 March 9 – Raul Lambino, lawyer
 March 14 – Leo Austria, basketball player and coach
 April 4 – Ces Quesada, actress and TV host
 May 21 – Isko Salvador, actor and comedian
 April 26 – Jamby Madrigal, politician and businesswoman
 May 27 – Jesse Robredo, former Mayor of Naga and Interior and Local Government secretary (d. 2012)
 June 10 – Jose I. Tejada, politician
 June 13 – Sonny Parsons, actor, singer, and member of the Filipino band, Hagibis (d. 2020)
 July 16:
 Sally Ponce Enrile, politician
 Jack Enrile, politician
 July 18 – Malou de Guzman, actress
 August 19:
 Manuel Mamba, politician
 Chito Loyzaga, basketball player
 October 5 – Dagul, dwarf actor and comedian
 December 13 – Allan K., comedian and host
 December 21 – Cerge Remonde, journalist and politician (d. 2010)
 December 28 – Claire dela Fuente, singer (d. 2021)

Deaths
 February 27 – Ruperto Kangleon, military figure and politician (b. 1890)

References